The Dispatch may refer to:

Website 
 The Dispatch, a subscription-based advertisement-free U.S. conservative online publication

Newspapers 
 The Columbus Dispatch, Ohio
 St. Louis Post-Dispatch, Missouri
 Richmond Times-Dispatch, Virginia, also under name Daily Dispatch
 The Herald-Dispatch, West Virginia
 Cordele Dispatch, Georgia
 The Commercial Dispatch, Mississippi
 New York Dispatch, New York
 Observer-Dispatch, Central New York
 Dallas Dispatch, Texas
 Sunday Dispatch (1801–1961), Britain
 The York Dispatch, Pennsylvania
 Pittsburgh Dispatch, Pennsylvania
 Daily Dispatch, South African newspaper
 Daily Dispatch (UK), a British newspaper founded in 1900 which merged with the News Chronicle in 1955
 The Daily Dispatch, North Carolina
 The Dispatch / The Rock Island Argus, Quad Cities, Illinois/Iowa
 The Dispatch (Lexington), Lexington, North Carolina
 Hudson Dispatch, New Jersey
 Desert Dispatch, Barstow, California
 The Dispatch (Jammu and Kashmir), India

Other uses 
 Dispatch (band), a jam band from Vermont
 The Last Dispatch, a 2005 documentary film by Helmut Schleppi overviewing and giving greater insight into the final days of the indie rock band Dispatch, which culminated with two final live concerts

See also
 Dispatch (disambiguation)
 Weekly Dispatch (disambiguation)